The following is a list of notable deaths in December 2005.

Entries for each day are listed alphabetically by surname. A typical entry lists information in the following sequence:
 Name, age, country of citizenship at birth, subsequent country of citizenship (if applicable), reason for notability, cause of death (if known), and reference.

December 2005

1
Gust Avrakotos, 67, American CIA agent who armed the mujaheddin of Afghanistan.
Mary Hayley Bell, 94, British actress, Alzheimer's disease.
Hermann Buchner, 86, German World War II flying ace.
Jack Colvin, 73, American actor, (The Incredible Hulk), coronary thrombosis.
Michael Evans, 61, American White House photographer, noted for capturing the trademark image of Ronald Reagan wearing a cowboy hat, cancer.
Ray Hanna, 77, New Zealand-born warbird pilot and founder of The Old Flying Machine Company.
Victor Premasagar, 78, Indian theologian and Bishop of Medak (1983–1992).

2
Lillian Browse, 99, British art dealer.
Shawn Paul Humphries, 34, American convicted murderer, executed in South Carolina.
Malik Joyeux, 25, French professional surfer, killed at Hawaii's Banzai Pipeline.
William P. Lawrence, 75, American retired U.S. Navy Vice Admiral, first to fly at twice the speed of sound.
Leonard Lewis, 78, British television director and producer.
Peter Menegazzo, 61, Australian cattle baron, killed (along with his wife Angela) in a plane crash.
Van Tuong Nguyen, 25, Australian convicted of drug trafficking, execution by hanging.
V. Krishna Rao, 80, Indian politician.
Mohammed Amza Zubeidi, 67, Iraqi politician, former prime minister under Saddam Hussein.

3
Peter Aschwanden, 63, American illustrator, cancer.
Frederick Ashworth, 93, American naval officer, weaponeer who dropped atomic bomb on Nagasaki.
Peter Cook, 62, Australian politician, melanoma.
Lance Dossor, 90, Australian pianist.
John Ganzoni, 2nd Baron Belstead, 73, British aristocrat and politician.
Kikka Sirén, 41, Finnish pop/schlager singer, heart attack.
Kåre Kristiansen, 85, Norwegian politician, minister of Oil and Energy (1983–1986).
Atsuko Tanaka, 74, Japanese avant-garde artist.
Allan Waters, 84, Canadian broadcasting icon

4
Débora Arango, 98, Colombian artist.
Percy Brandt, 83, Swedish actor.
Errol Brathwaite, 81, New Zealand writer.
Gregg Hoffman, 42, American film producer (Saw).
Gloria Lasso, 83, Spanish singer.

5
John Alvheim, 75, Norwegian politician.
Gerald Smedley Andrews, 101, Canadian civil servant.
Wesley Baker, 47, American convicted murderer, executed in Maryland.
Liu Binyan, 80, Chinese author and dissident, cancer.
Gerard Bruggink, 88, Dutch World War II pilot.
Ursula Buckel, 79, German soprano.
Netai Bysack, 84, Indian Olympic cyclist.
Milo Dor, 82, Serbian-born Austrian author, heart failure.
Edward L. Masry, 73, American attorney and mentor to Erin Brockovich, complications of diabetes.
Kevin "Big Kev" McQuay, 56, Australian businessman and media personality, heart attack.
Frits Philips, 100, Dutch businessman, grandson of the founder of Philips, complications from a fall.
Bob Richardson, 77, American fashion photographer.
Bill Robinson, 71, British rugby league player.

6
Charly Gaul, 72, Luxembourgian cyclist, winner of the 1958 Tour de France.
Richard Grimsdale, 76, British electrical engineer, built the world's first transistorised computer and was at the forefront of work on Read Only Memory.
Paul Halla, 74, Austrian footballer.
Hanns Dieter Hüsch, 80, German political satirist.
Devan Nair, 82, President of Singapore (1981–1985).
Jerzy Pajaczkowski-Dydynski, 111, Polish-born oldest man in the UK at the time of his death.
Danny Williams, 63, South African popular singer, lung cancer.

7
Lucy d'Abreu, 113, Indian-born oldest person in the UK at the time of her death.
Rigoberto Alpizar, 44, American airplane passenger fatally shot by U.S. Air Marshals after allegedly claiming he had placed a bomb aboard.
Martine Bercher, 61, American football player.
Adrian Biddle, 53, British cinematographer (Aliens, The Princess Bride, Thelma & Louise), heart attack.
Marvin Braude, 85, American member of Los Angeles City Council.
Carroll A. Campbell, Jr., 65, American politician, former South Carolina governor (1987–1995), and member of U.S. House of Representatives (1979–1987).
Bud Carson, 75, American football player, former NFL head coach, emphysema.
Loomis Dean, 88, American photographer, notably for Life magazine.

8
R. W. Bradford, 58, American writer, publisher of Liberty magazine, kidney cancer.
Dame Rose Heilbron, 91, British judge.
Donald Martino, 74, American composer.
George D. Painter, 91, British biographer.
Leo Scheffczyk, 85, German Roman Cardinal Deacon of San Francesco Saverio alla Garbatella, Germany.
Roger Shattuck, 82, American writer and critic, prostate cancer.
J.N. Williamson, 73, American horror writer, author and publisher.
Georgiy Zhzhonov, 90, Russian actor and writer.

9
Alan John Beale, 72, British virologist.
Norman Blundell, 88, Australian cricketer.
Mike Botts, 61, American drummer with 1970s soft rock band Bread, toured and recorded with Linda Ronstadt, Dan Fogelberg, Tina Turner and others, cancer.
Homer Mensch, 91, American internationally known bass player, Juilliard teacher.
Eunice Norton, 97, American classical pianist and music promoter.
György Sándor, 93, Hungarian internationally famous pianist, Juilliard teacher, heart failure.
Robert Sheckley, 77, American science fiction author, brain aneurysm.

10
Frank Cooke, 92, American entrepreneur.
Mary Jackson, 95, American schoolteacher and actress (The Waltons, Parenthood).
Eugene McCarthy, 89, American politician, former Democratic United States Senator from Minnesota (1959–1971), and United States Representative (1949–1959) and presidential primary candidate.
Jim McIntyre, 78, American basketball player.
Richard Pryor, 65, American comedian and actor (Stir Crazy, Harlem Nights), heart attack and complications of multiple sclerosis.
Clark G. Reynolds, 65, American naval historian.

11
Walter Cudzik, 73, American NFL and American Football League center for the Boston Patriots.
Del Philpott, 82, American soldier and scientist.
Richard Sandbrook, 59, British environmentalist.
Hayim Tadmor, 82, Israeli Assyriologist and professor.

12
Eric D'Arcy, 81, Australia Archbishop of the Archdiocese of Hobart, Tasmania.
Max Mariu, 53, First Maori Catholic bishop.
Robert Newmyer, 49, American film producer (The Santa Clause, Training Day, Sex, Lies, and Videotape), heart attack triggered by asthma.
David Pritchard, 86, British chess player and chess writer.
Gebran Tueni, 48, Lebanese journalist and politician, assassinated by a car bomb.

13
John Barraclough, 79, Australian politician.
Sir Roland Guy, 77, British army general.
John Langstaff, 84, American singer and music educator.
Dick Nolan, 66, Canadian musician.
Stanley "Tookie" Williams, 51, American convicted murderer and co-founder of the Crips turned anti-gang activist, executed by lethal injection for killing 4 people in California.

14
Erhard Ahmann, 64, German football manager.
Stew Bowers, 90, American baseball player.
Gordon Duncan, 41, Scottish musician and bagpiper, suicide.
Rokuro Ishikawa, 80, Japanese businessman (Kajima Corporation).
Sudhir Joshi, 57, Indian actor, heart attack.
John B. Nixon, 77, American convicted murderer, executed in Mississippi.
William "Duke" Procter, 106, Canadian World War I veteran.
Rodney William Whitaker, 74, British author, wrote under pseudonyms such as "Trevanian."
C. I. Paul, 61, Indian (Malayalam) actor, heart attack.

15
Maurice Beresford, 85, British economic historian and archaeologist.
James Ingo Freed, 75, American architect.
Giuseppe Patroni Griffi, 84, Italian writer and director of movies and theatre.
Heinrich Gross, 90, Austrian alleged Nazi doctor and war criminal.
Walter Haut, 83, American retired U.S. Army lieutenant, central figure in the Roswell UFO incident in 1947.
Stan Leonard, 90, Canadian golfer, heart failure.
Julian Marías, 91, Spanish philosopher and father of author Javier Marías.
John McIntyre, 89, Scottish theologian.
Akira Ohgi, 70, Japanese baseball player and manager.
Jim Ostendarp, 82, American football coach at Amherst College for 33 years.
William Proxmire, 90, American politician, Democratic Senator from Wisconsin (1957–1989), complications of Alzheimer's disease.
Darrell Russell, 29, American former NFL player for the Oakland Raiders and Tampa Bay Buccaneers, car accident.

16
Anthony Barber, 85, British politician and former Conservative Party Chancellor of the Exchequer, complications of Parkinson's disease.
Boyi Bhimanna, 94, Indian Telugu poet.
Kenneth Bulmer, 84, English writer (pseudonyms included Alan Burt Akers and Dray Prescot).
Joseph Owades, 86, American biochemist, inventor of light beer.
John Spencer, 58, American actor (The West Wing, L.A. Law, The Rock), Emmy winner (2002), heart attack.
Enzo Stuarti, 86, Italian tenor, was in many Broadway musicals, heart failure.

17
Jack Anderson, 83, American Pulitzer Prize-winning columnist, complications of Parkinson's disease.
Mustafa Ertan, 79, Turkish footballer.
Marc Favreau, 76, French Canadian television and film actor, best known for his creation of the clown Sol.
Jacques Fouroux, 58, French rugby union captain and coach, heart attack.
Sverre Stenersen, 79, Norwegian Gold medal winner in the 1956 Winter Olympics.
Haljand Udam, 69, Estonian translator and encyclopedist.

18
Keith Duckworth, 72, British automotive designer.
Doug Dye, 84, New Zealand microbiologist.
Howie Ferguson, 75, American former NFL player.
Doris Fisher, Baroness Fisher of Rednal, 86, British politician and peer. 
Barry Halper, 66, American baseball memorabilia collector and limited partner for the New York Yankees.
Belita Jepson-Turner, 82, British Olympic skater and film actress.
P.M. Sayeed, 64, Indian Minister of Power, heart attack.
Alan M. Voorhees, 83, American transportation engineer and city planner

19
Billy Amstell, 94, British jazz musician.
Sir Charles Brett, 77, Northern Irish architectural historian.
George Bromilow, 74, British footballer at the 1956 Summer Olympics.
Vincent Gigante, 77, American Genovese family crime boss, heart disease.
Phyllis Gretzky, 64, Canadian mother of NHL legend Wayne Gretzky, lung cancer.
Julio Iglesias, Sr., 90, Spanish gynaecologist who is among the oldest men to have fathered a child (also Julio Iglesias's father and Enrique Iglesias's grandfather), heart attack.
Marjorie Kellogg, 83, American author and playwright (Tell Me That You Love Me, Junie Moon).

20
Raoul Bott, 82, Hungarian-born American Harvard mathematician, cancer.
Argentina Brunetti, 98, Argentine actress. (It's a Wonderful Life, The Caddy), writer, journalist.
Theodore Holmes Bullock, 90, American neuroscientist.
Bradford Cannon, 98, American plastic surgeon, pneumonia.
Genrikh Fedosov, 73, Soviet football player.
William W. Howells, 97, American anthropologist.
Billy Hughes, 57, American former child/film actor during the 1960s.
Graham Wilson, 66, Australian rugby league player.

21
Vicente de Cadenas y Vicent, 90, Spanish officer of arms.
Horace Ellis Crouch, 87, American military aviator, member of the Doolittle Raid.
Myron Healey, 82, American film actor who normally played Western villains.
Elrod Hendricks, 64, U.S. Virgin Islander Baltimore Orioles coach, former MLB catcher, heart attack.
Hallam Tennyson, 85, British radio producer and great-grandson of Alfred, Lord Tennyson, suspected victim of murder.

22
Richard Bellucci, 91, American ear surgeon and inventor.
Cooper Evans, 81, American politician, former Republican US Representative from Iowa from 1981–1987.
Aurora Miranda, 90, Brazilian entertainer, sister of Carmen Miranda; she appeared in The Three Caballeros (1945) in which she danced with Donald Duck.
Bill Scott, 82, Australian author.

23
Lajos Baróti, 91, Hungarian football coach.
Selma Jeanne Cohen, 85, American dance historian, editor of The International Encyclopedia of Dance.
G. Blakemore Evans, 93, American Shakespeare scholar, author of The Riverside Shakespeare, stroke.
Truman Gibson, 93, American anti-segregation lawyer and boxing promoter.
Harold Hallman, 43, Canadian football player.
Emmett Leith, 78, American electrical engineer.
Kay Stammers, 91, British tennis player.
Norman D. Vaughan, 100, American explorer and sportsman, part of Richard Byrd's 1928 South Pole expedition. 
Yao Wenyuan, 74, Chinese Communist political leader, member of the Gang of Four.

24
Bhanumathi, 80, Indian film actress, director, singer/songwriter.
Georg Johannesen, 74, Norwegian author and professor of rhetoric.
Constance Keene, 84, American classical pianist known for playing the romantic repertoire
Harold Lawton, 106, British academic and veteran of the First World War
Michael Vale, 83, American actor who appeared in over 1,300 commercials as the sleepy doughnut maker for Dunkin' Donuts from 1982–1997, diabetes.
Wang Daohan, 90, Chinese negotiator for People's Republic of China in cross-straits talks, who contributed to the formation of the 1992 Consensus with Koo Chen-fu from the Republic of China on Taiwan.

25
Felice Andreasi, 77, Italian actor.
Derek Bailey, 75, English free improvising avant-garde guitarist, motor neuron disease.
Robert Barbers, 61, Filipino politician, former Philippines senator, heart attack.
Donald Dawson, 97, American lawyer, executive assistant to Harry S. Truman.
Robert Duthie, 80, American-born British orthopaedic surgeon.
John Hayes, 76, British art historian and museum curator.
Henry Kock, 53, Canadian horticulturist and eco-activist, brain cancer.
Birgit Nilsson, 87, Swedish soprano.
Joseph Pararajasingham, 71, Sri Lankan politician and supporter of the Tamil Tiger rebels, shot and killed at a midnight Christmas Mass.
Sarat Chandra Sinha, 92, Indian politician, Chief Minister of Assam.
Clint Sampson, 44, American football player, car accident.
Roy Stuart, 70, American actor.

26
Mikuláš Athanasov, 75, Czechoslovak wrestler.
Julian "Bud" Blake, 87, American cartoonist (Tiger).
Muriel Costa-Greenspon, 68, American mezzo-soprano at the New York City Opera for 30 years.
John Diebold, 79, American businessman, pioneering American computer engineer.
Ted Ditchburn, 84, English football goalkeeper (Tottenham Hotspur, England national football team).
Ernesto Leal, 60, Nicaraguan politician, presidential chief of staff and former foreign minister of Nicaragua, pneumonia.
Kerry Packer, 68, Australian businessman, publishing, media and gaming tycoon, Australia's richest individual amassing a fortune of over $6 billion.
Vincent Schiavelli, 57, American actor (Ghost, Buffy the Vampire Slayer, One Flew Over the Cuckoo's Nest), lung cancer.
John Taylor, 80, Canadian football player (St. Hyacinthe-Donnacona Navy and Montreal Alouettes).
Erich Topp, 91, German U-boat commander in World War II.

27
Stuart Alexander, 44, American businessman and murderer.
Philip N. Carney, 86, American politician, member of the Massachusetts House of Representatives.
Xavier Connor, 88, Australian jurist, foundation judge of the Federal Court of Australia, President of the Australian Law Reform Commission 1985–1987.
Dee Pollock, 68, American film and television actor.
Giancarlo Primo, 81, Italian basketball coach, the first to defeat National Teams USA and USSR in 1970s.
Tokuji Wakasa, 91, Japanese businessman, former president of All Nippon Airways.

28
Bruce Carver, 57, American video game developer.
Patrick Cranshaw, 86, American actor (Old School, Best in Show, Herbie: Fully Loaded), pneumonia.
Tage Ekfeldt, 79, Swedish Olympic sprinter.
Stevo Žigon, 79, Serbian actor and theatre director.

29
Armand Phillip Bartos, 95, American architect.
Gerda Boyesen, 83, Norwegian psychologist.
Dan Carnevale, 87, American baseball player.
Abuna Yesehaq Mandefro, 72, Ethiopian Orthodox Archbishop.
Ray Mattox, 78, American politician.
Eileen Nolan, 85, British Director of the Women's Royal Army Corps.
Elizabeth Parcells, 54, American operatic coloratura soprano.
Sir Cyril Philips, 93, British historian and academic administrator.
Sir Eric Stroud, 81, British paediatrician.

30
Eddie Barlow, 65, South African cricketer.
Candy Barr, 70, American exotic dancer, pneumonia.
Charles J. Bowles, 83, American physical education expert.
Pasquale Carpino, 69, Italian-born Canadian television chef and operatic singer.
Tory Dent, 47, American poet, essayist and art critic.
Rona Jaffe, 74, American novelist (The Best of Everything, Mazes and Monsters), cancer.
Fred "Jock" Smith, 79, Scottish footballer (Hull City, Sheffield United and Millwall).
Bobby Stevens, 98, American baseball player.

31
Sanora Babb, 98, American writer.
Enrico Di Giuseppe, 73, American operatic tenor, cancer.
Maurice Dodd, 83, British cartoonist (The Perishers), brain haemorrhage.
Sir John Peel, 101, British gynaecologist.
Maclovia Ruiz, 95, American dancer, pneumonia.
Xolilizwe Mzikayise Sigcawu, 79, South African King of the Gcaleka.
David Trustram Eve, 2nd Baron Silsoe, 75, British lawyer.
Phillip Whitehead, 68, British politician and television presenter, MP for Derby North, heart attack.

References 

2005-12
 12